Steven H. Collis (born 1961) is an American businessman, the chairman, president and chief executive officer (CEO) of AmerisourceBergen.

Early life 
Collis was born in South Africa and attended the University of Witwatersrand, where he received a Bachelor of Commerce with Honors.

Career 
Collis joined AmerisourceBergen in 2001 as the Senior Vice President. In November 2010, Collis was promoted to president and COO of the company and in July 2011, Collis became CEO.

References

21st-century American businesspeople
Living people
1961 births
University of the Witwatersrand alumni